Ichchadhari naag (female: ichchadhari naagin) are mythical shape-shifting cobras in Indian folklore. They are great devotees of Lord Shiva.

Legend
A common male cobra will become an ichchadhari naag (male shape-shifting cobra) and a common female cobra will become an ichchadhari naagin (female shape-shifting cobra) after 100 years of tapasya (penance). After being blessed by Lord Shiva, they attain a human form of their own, have the ability to shape-shifting into any living creatures and could live for more than a hundred years without getting old.

Ichchadhari naags and naagins possess the gem called Naagmani, considered much more valuable than any precious stone, it has the power to revive. Legends tell of many people dying through snake bites when they try to steal the Naagmani.

When a naag or a naagin is killed, the image of theirs killer will be imprinted in their eyes. The partner or family of that naag/naagin will identify the killers by this image and take revenge.

Naags and naagins will lose control and are forced to show their true form when they hear the sound of been, a wind instrument used by sapera (snake charmer). They are afraid of bel patra (bael leaf) because it can hurt them, human use bel patra to protect themselves from naags and naagins.

The realm of naags and naagins is called Naaglok. Naaglok have different clans, the ruler of each clan is a Naagraj (king) or a Naagrani (queen).

Naags and naagins' enemies are mongoose, eagle and peafowl.

Children's comics
The legends of ichchadhari naag and naagin have been used as a plot basis for many comics and stories. The comic book superhero character Nagraj ("Cobra-King") is also based on these legends. There is another famous Hindi comic character, Tausi, who was a male shape-shifting snake. Apart from these, the concept has been used for many children's short stories.

Films and TV shows

Many Bollywood films incorporate these legends, or the character of Nagraj, such as Nagin, Sridevi in the 1986 film Nagina, Reena Roy in Nagin (1976), and also Nache Nagin Gali Gali (1989).

In 2007, a television series called Naaginn began on Zee TV, in which Sayantani Ghosh played the role of a naagin.

In 2010, a horror adventure film called Hisss appeared, starring Mallika Sherawat as a naagin.

In 2015, a television series called Naagin began on Colors TV. Starring Mouni Roy and Adaa Khan as naagin. It became one of the highest-rated shows on Indian television.

In 2016, a soap opera Nagarjuna - Ek Yoddha started starring Nikitan Dheer, Mrunal Jain and Pearl v puri as ichchadhari naag.

In 2016, the soap opera Ichhapyaari Naagin started, starring Priyal Gor as a naagin.

Another television series which has a shape-shifting serpent role is Nandini, which started airing on 23 January 2017. It is simultaneously aired in four different Indian languages: Tamil (original version), Kannada (re-shot), Telugu (dubbed) and Malayalam (dubbed).

The first Pakistani serial about ichchadhari naagin titled Naagin aired on 17 April 2017.

In 2019, Phir Laut Aayi Naagin aired on Dangal TV. Starring Nikita Sharma as a naagin.

In 2022, Ishq Ki Dastaan - Naagmani aired on Dangal TV. Starring Aditya Redij and Aleya Ghosh as naag and naagin.

See also 
 Nāga

References

Comparative mythology
Legendary serpents
Shapeshifting
Hindu legendary creatures
Shaivism
Indian folklore